Salisbury East is a suburb of Adelaide, South Australia, located 20 kilometres north of the Adelaide CBD. The residential part of the suburb is in the local government area (LGA) of the City of Salisbury, however the eastern part of the Cobbler Creek Recreation Park is in the boundaries of the City of Tea Tree Gully.

See also
 List of Adelaide suburbs

References

Suburbs of Adelaide